Ion Hobana (25 January 1931, Sânnicolau Mare – 22 February 2011, Bucharest) was a Romanian science fiction writer, literary critic and ufologist. Ion Hobana is a literary pseudonym, the writer's real name being Aurelian Manta Roşie.

Bibliography

Science fiction
 Ultimul val (novel; Editura Tineretului, 1957)
 Caleidoscop (novel; Editura Tineretului, 1958)
 Oameni şi stele (novel; Editura Tineretului, 1963)
 Viitorul a inceput ieri - retrospectiva ancipaţiei franceze (Editura Tineretului, 1966)
 Imaginile posibilului: filmul ştiinţifico-fantastic (Meridiane, 1968)
 Sfârşitul vacanţei (novel; Editura Tineretului, 1969)
 Vârsta de aur a anticipaţiei româneşti (1969) - Writers' Union Prize, 1972
 Douăzeci de mii de pagini în căutarea lui Jules Verne (Univers, 1979) - Writers' Union Prize
 Science fiction. Autori, cărţi, idei I (Editura Eminescu, 1983) - Writers' Union Prize
 Literatura de anticipaţie. Autori, cărţi, idei II (1986)
 Un fel de spaţiu (short stories; Albatros, 1988)
 Călătorie întreruptă (novel; Cartea Românească, 1989)
 Jules Verne în România? (Editura Fundaţiei Culturale Române, 1993)
 Un englez neliniştit: H.G. Wells şi universul SF (Fahrenheit, 1996)

Ufology
 OZN - o sfidare pentru raţiunea umană (Editura Enciclopedică Română, 1971), with Julien Weverbergh
 Ufo's in Oost en West (Deventer, 1972, 2 volumes)
 Triumful visătorilor (Nemira, 1991), with Julien Weverbergh
 Enigme pe cerul istoriei (Abeona, 1993)

References

Romanian science fiction writers
Ufologists
1931 births
2011 deaths
International Writing Program alumni